Jacques Revel (born July 25, 1942) is a French historian. He is the emeritus director of studies and past president of l'École des hautes études en sciences sociales (EHESS).

Publications 
 with Michel de Certeau and Dominique Julia, Une politique de la langue. La Révolution française et les patois. L'enquête de Grégoire (1790-1794), Paris, 1975 ; rééd. augmentée d'une postface de D. Julia et J. Revel, Paris, Gallimard, Folio, 2002.
 with Dominique Julia and Roger Chartier, Histoire sociale des populations étudiantes, Paris, EHES, 2 vol.
 (éd.), Jeux d'échelle, Paris, Le Seuil-Gallimard, 1996
 with François Hartog (dir.), Les usages politiques du passé, Enquête, Paris, éditions de l'EHESS, 2001.
 with G. Levi (eds.), Political Uses of the Past. The Recent Mediterranean Experience, Frank Cass, Londres-Portland, 2002.
 with Jean-Claude Passeron (dir.), Penser par cas, Enquête, Paris, Éditions de l'EHESS, 2005.
 Un momento historiográfico, Buenos Aires, Manantial, 2006.
 (éd.), Giochi di scala. La microstoria alla prova dell'esperienza, Rome, Viella, 2006.
 Las Construcciones francesas del pasado, La escuela francesa y la historiografía del pasado, Fondo de Cultura Económica, Buenos Aires, 2002.
 Un parcours critique. Douze essais d'histoire sociale, Paris, Galaade, 2006.
 with Jean Boutier et Jean-Claude Passeron (dir.), Qu'est-ce qu'une discipline ?, Paris, Éditions de l'EHESS, « Enquête 5 », 2006.

References

21st-century French historians
Living people
Academic staff of the School for Advanced Studies in the Social Sciences
Year of birth missing (living people)
Place of birth missing (living people)